{{Taxobox
| image = Agathia laetata (7211424074).jpg
| image_caption = 
| regnum = Animalia
| phylum = Arthropoda
| classis = Insecta
| ordo = Lepidoptera
| familia = Geometridae
| genus = Agathia
| species = A. laetata
| binomial = Agathia laetata
| binomial_authority = (Fabricius, 1794)<ref name="funet">{{cite web |last=Savela |first=Markku |url=http://www.nic.funet.fi/pub/sci/bio/life/insecta/lepidoptera/ditrysia/geometroidea/geometridae/geometrinae/agathia/#laetata |title=Agathia laetata’’ (Fabricius, 1794) |website=Lepidoptera and Some Other Life Forms |accessdate=July 24, 2018}}</ref>
| synonyms = Phalaena laetata Fabricius, 1794Agathia catenaria Walker, 1861Agathia laetata isogyna Prout, 1916Agathia furcula Matsumura, 1931Agathia laetata andamanensis Prout, 1932
}}Agathia laetata is a species of moth of the family Geometridae which was first described by Johan Christian Fabricius in 1794. It is found in India, Indochina, southern China, Taiwan and Sundaland.

Description
Its wingspan is about 38 mm. This species differs from other  Agathia species by having outer rufous area of inner edge evenly curved on forewing and dentate on hindwings. The green patch below apex of each wing is oval. The green spots towards inner margin of the hindwings are rarely developed. The ocellus is more developed.

Larvae are green, with forsal prominences on first and eleventh somites. Pupa are yellowish green above, green below, the abdominal somites black speckled. The larvae feed on Ichnocarpus, Nerium and Marsdenia'' species. Eggs are shining light green, oval, flat topped or concave.

References

Geometrinae
Moths described in 1794
Moths of Asia